Fumina Shibayama (born 13 April 2000) is a Japanese professional footballer who plays as a midfielder for WE League club Urawa Reds.

Club career 
Shibayama made her WE League debut on 16 October 2021.

References 

Japanese women's footballers
Living people
2000 births
Women's association football midfielders
Association football people from Aichi Prefecture
Urawa Red Diamonds Ladies players
WE League players
Sportspeople from Nagoya